Rare! compiles tracks from four Crack the Sky albums from 1983–1990, two of John Palumbo's solo albums, and previously unreleased live and demo recordings. It was released in 1994 on CD.

Track listing

1994 compilation albums
Crack the Sky albums